Safe Child Africa is a UK registered charity based in Manchester, England that works with and through Nigerian partners to protect and uphold child rights in the Niger Delta region of Nigeria. It was founded by Gary Foxcroft in 2005.

History 

The charity began in 2003 when Gary Foxcroft visited Nigeria to undertake research into community perceptions of the oil industry for his master's degree at Lancaster University. After witnessing the plight of abandoned children living rough on the streets and the poor state of the region’s education system, Foxcroft vowed to return and build a school for disadvantaged children. He also met an inspirational local head teacher, Grace Udua, who generously offered to donate her family land as the site for the school.

Upon return to the UK, Foxcroft and his wife Naomi set about raising the funds  needed to help establish a model school. Safe Child Africa (then called Stepping Stones Nigeria) was registered as a charity with the UK Charity Commission in December 2005. Gary and Naomi then returned to Nigeria during 2006 to build the Stepping Stones Model School with support from the local community.

While living in Nigeria and working on the school, Gary and Naomi became aware of a number of children living on the streets who had been abandoned and abused due to the belief that they were "witches". They then began to work with local Nigerian NGOs to help to support these children and to campaign for their rights.

Documentaries

Saving Africa's Witch Children 

The work of the charity was featured in award-winning documentary from Dispatches. The documentary won a BAFTA, an Emmy and an Amnesty International award. 
This programme first aired on 12 November 2008 and told the story of young children who had been labeled witches and wizards by their family and community and left abandoned, tortured, imprisoned or killed in the delta state of Akwa Ibom in Nigeria. The programme followed the charity's founder Gary Foxcroft and the work they do rescuing and protecting children abused or at risk of abuse due to witchcraft accusations . The programme suggests that the problem is caused by a combination of African traditional beliefs and extreme Christian Pentecostal groups. In particular the programme singles out Liberty Foundation Gospel Ministries for producing a film called End of the Wicked, which the charity understand has contributed greatly to the increase in children being abandoned by their families and communities.

Return to Africa's Witch Children 

A second documentary in 2009 called Return to Africa’s Witch Children revisits Akwa Ibom State to record the changes brought about by the work of Safe Child Africa.

Campaigns and projects

Prevent Abuse of Children Today (PACT) Campaign 
PACT is a global campaign that aims to give a voice to the voiceless and bring about long-term change for the Nigerian child, particularly those at risk of child rights violations including witchcraft-related abuse and trafficking. Through its coalition of supporters PACT pressures key leaders and decision makers in Nigeria to take action. PACT also use a wide variety of other tools, such as media campaigns, demonstrations and conferences to enlighten and inform people and to fight for the rights of innocent children.

The Fake Prophet - Nollywood film 
Working in partnership with Nollywood Director Teco Benson, the charity produced this "ground breaking film that powerfully encapsulates many major child rights issues that the Nigerian child faces today, including child witchcraft accusations, child trafficking and child abandonment". The Fake Prophet premièred in Nigeria in July 2011.

Eno's Story 
The charity, together with Nigerian publisher Cassava Republic, published a children's book called Eno's Story.  Written by Ayodele Olofintuade, Eno's Story is a moving and beautifully illustrated story about Eno a young girl branded a witch by an uncle, who uses courage and imagination to overcome a challenging situation.

See also 
Akwa Ibom State
False prophet
Leo Igwe
Niger Delta
Nollywood
Witchcraft and children

Footnotes

References 
 "Saving Africa's Witch Children", Dispatches, Channel 4.
 .

External links 
 Safe Child Africa

Children's rights organisations in the United Kingdom
Human rights organizations based in Nigeria
Charities based in Manchester
Organizations established in 2005
2005 establishments in England
Child welfare in Nigeria
Foreign charities operating in Nigeria